The 2012–13 CE Sabadell FC season is the 80th season in club history.

Trophies balance

Competitive Balance

Summer transfers

In

Out

Loan in

Loan end

Current squad
Updated to 24 July 2012

Youth system

Match stats

Match results

Pre-season and friendly tournaments

Liga Adelante

 Win   Draw   Lost

 Liga Adelante Winners (also promoted)
 Direct promotion to Liga BBVA (Liga Adelante Runners-up)
 Liga BBVA promotion play-offs
 Relegation to Segunda División B

Copa del Rey

Second Qualifying Round

Third Qualifying Round

References

Spanish football clubs 2012–13 season
2012-13
2012–13 in Catalan football